Farhan Ahmad Malhi is a Pakistani actor, model and former video jockey. He is known for his roles in dramas Kaisay Tum Se Kahoon, Hiddat, Uraan, Kaisa Hai Naseeban, Banno and Mohabbat Chor Di Maine.

Early life
Farhan was born in Lahore, Pakistan. He completed his studies from National College Of Business Administration & Economics and graduated with an MBA degree.

Career
He began his career as VJ on Style360 and then he started modeling. In 2015 he made his debut as an actor in drama Kaisay Tum Se Kahoon as Ajju. He was noted for his roles in dramas Tumhari Natasha, Shehrnaz and Kathputli. He also appeared in dramas Rani Nokrani, Maamta, Tere Lie, Shiza, Faltu Larki and Rashk. Since then he appeared in dramas Hiddat, Kaisa Hai Naseeban, Laikin, Uraan, Banno and Mohabbat Chor Di Maine.

Filmography

Television

Telefilm

References

External links
 
 
 

1992 births
Living people
21st-century Pakistani male actors
Pakistani male television actors